Western promenade dances are a form of partner dance traditionally danced to country-western music, and which are stylistically associated with American country and/or western traditions.

Specific dances are often associated with a specific song or songs, for example "San Antonio Stroll", "Orange Blossom Special" and "Cotton-Eyed Joe".

In promenade-style partner dancing the partners (dance couple) dance side-by-side, maintaining a connection with each other through a promenade handhold.  The man dances traditionally to the left of the woman.  There is no leader or follower, as in ballroom-style partner dancing, because both partners execute the steps identically.  However, the man does function as a leader in a limited capacity, when and if there is undertaken turns, twirls and other fancy arm maneuvers.

See also
Country–western dance
Schottische

Social dance